Rudniki  is a village in Olesno County, Opole Voivodeship, in south-western Poland. It is the seat of the gmina (administrative district) called Gmina Rudniki.

In 2004 the village had a population of 897.

References

Rudniki